Song of the Eagle is a 1933 American pre-Code drama film directed by Ralph Murphy and starring Charles Bickford, Richard Arlen, Mary Brian and Jean Hersholt. It was produced and distributed by Paramount Pictures. Its release coincided with the ongoing repeal of the Eighteenth Amendment that had outlawed alcohol.

Synopsis
The film follows the fortunes of the German American family Hoffman from 1916 to 1933 during World War I, when the United States is at war with their native Germany, and during the Prohibition Era when the family's lager business is suddenly made illegal. If the family's brewery is to continue they need to turn to bootlegging.

Cast 
Charles Bickford as Joe Anderson
Richard Arlen as Bill Hoffman
Mary Brian as Elsa Kranzmeyer
Jean Hersholt as Otto Hoffman
Louise Dresser as Emma Hoffman
Andy Devine as Mud
George E. Stone as Gus
Gene Morgan as Charlie
Bert Sprotte as Emil Kranzmeyer
George Meeker as August Hoffmann
Julie Haydon as Gretchen
James Bradbury Jr. as Slats

References

Bibliography
 Schlossheimer, Michael. Gunmen and Gangsters: Profiles of Nine Actors Who Portrayed Memorable Screen Tough Guys. McFarland, 2018.

External links 
 

1933 films
American drama films
1933 drama films
Paramount Pictures films
Films directed by Ralph Murphy
Films about beer
Films about prohibition in the United States
American black-and-white films
1930s English-language films
1930s American films
American World War I films
Films set in the 1910s
Films set in the 1920s